Almas Uteshov (born 30 March 1988) is a Kazakhstani weightlifter. He competed for Kazakhstan at the 2012 Summer Olympics.

In November 2016 it was announced retests of the samples taken from the 2012 Olympics indicated that Uteshov had tested positive for prohibited substances. The IOC Disciplinary Commission disqualified Uteshov from the Olympic Games 2012.

References

Kazakhstani male weightlifters
Weightlifters at the 2012 Summer Olympics
Olympic weightlifters of Kazakhstan
1988 births
Living people
World Weightlifting Championships medalists
Weightlifters at the 2006 Asian Games
Weightlifters at the 2010 Asian Games
Weightlifters at the 2014 Asian Games
Asian Games medalists in weightlifting
Asian Games silver medalists for Kazakhstan
Doping cases in weightlifting
Kazakhstani sportspeople in doping cases
Medalists at the 2014 Asian Games
20th-century Kazakhstani people
21st-century Kazakhstani people